Herpetopoma rubrum is a species of sea snail, a marine gastropod mollusk in the family Chilodontidae.

Description
The size of the shell varies between 4 mm and 15 mm. The umbilicate, solid shell has a conical shape. It has a bright rose or carmine color. The elevated spire is acute. The 5–6, convex whorls are rounded, encircled by alternately larger and smaller closely beaded riblets, numbering 9 on the penultimate, 4 on the next earlier whorl, about 14 on the last whorl, of equal size on its latter portion. The sutures are narrowly canaliculate. The body whorl is rounded. The rounded aperture is finely sulcate inside. The columella is straight, toothed at base, with a narrow, deep square notch between the tooth and the tubercles of the basal lip.

Distribution
This marine species occurs off Southern Japan and Australia.

References

 Higo, S., Callomon, P. & Goto, Y. (1999) Catalogue and Bibliography of the Marine Shell-Bearing Mollusca of Japan. Elle Scientific Publications, Yao, Japan, 749 pp.

External links
 To Encyclopedia of Life
 To World Register of Marine Species
 

rubrum
Gastropods described in 1853